Southmoreland is a neighborhood located in Kansas City, Missouri. Home to the Nelson-Atkins Museum of Art, Kemper Museum of Contemporary Art and the Kansas City Art Institute, it is noteworthy for its reputation as home to Kansas City’s artistic and intellectual elite. Southmoreland neighborhood is located between 39th Street on the north (bordering Hanover Place and Central Hyde Park), Rockhill and Gillham Road on the east (bordering South Hyde Park), Emanuel Cleaver II Boulevard on the south (bordering Country Club Plaza and Park Central) and Main Street on the west (bordering Plaza Westport and Old Westport). Since 2019, following finalized plans for a Streetcar extension from Union Station to UMKC, the neighborhood has experienced a massive wave of new real estate development along Main Street.

History

Established in the late 19th century as Kansas City's neighborhood of palatial mansions, the Southmoreland section of the Rockhill District was conceived by William Rockhill Nelson, the Kansas City Star publisher and a developer, and August Meyer, a mining magnate.  Nelson and Meyer's vision for the neighborhood was an extension of City Beautiful Movement — featuring naturalistic landscaping, open parkland, native stone fencing, and curved roadways lined with elm trees. Acquired by Nelson, and given to the City, the neighborhood evolved around a natural ravine, through which a small brook runs in the rainy times, first platted by W.B. Clark as South Moreland Addition. The landscaping of the park and adjacent areas intended to imitate the look and feel of neighborhoods around Central and Riverside Parks in New York City— by venerated architecture team of Frederick Law Olmsted and Calvert Vaux. It heightened the enjoyment of the turf, water and rock, using gentle, sprawling lawns, winding pathways and natural woodlands.

Framed by Nelson’s baronial manse, Oak Hall, and August Meyer’s palace, Marburg on Warwick Boulevard, Southmoreland has evolved into an eclectic mix of Colonial Revival mansions, Arts & Crafts style homes, and Colonnade luxury apartment buildings, many with native limestone accents. In early 20th century, a streetcar line was built between downtown Kansas City and the neighborhood began to attract working-class families with some of the larger mansions converted into apartments. Today, beyond the large museums and institutions of higher learning, Southmoreland has a number of artists’ studios, shops and galleries. In 2009, Southmoreland was voted as one amongst eight neighborhoods nationwide as the "Best Old House Neighborhoods: Editor's Pick" by This Old House.

Most recently, the neighborhood has attracted a massive new wave of real estate development following the planned $351 million-worth expansion of the KC Streetcar Main Street Extension project, that will add an additional 3.6 miles and 16 stops from Union Station to the University of Missouri — Kansas City (UMKC). The southward expansion will run through Southmoreland, ultimately connecting River Market to the Country Club Plaza, providing free public transit across the city’s largest business districts like Midtown, Westport, to the Art Museum District and the Plaza. On August 26, 2020, the Federal Transit Administration (FTA) announced that the KC Streetcar Main Street Extension project will receive additional $50.8 million in federal funding as part of the FTA’s New Starts Capital Investment Grants (CIG) Program.

References

Neighborhoods in Kansas City, Missouri